Hedyosmum correanum is a species of plant in the Chloranthaceae family. It is endemic to Panama.  It is threatened by habitat loss.

Background 
According to Vol 6. of Systematic Botany by  W. G. D'Arcy and Ronald L. Liesner Hedyosmum correanum does not have a large amount of research readily available as many popular plants or flowers might. At least as far as the taxonomy of the Hedyosmum in general is concerned.

This plant is currently an endangered plant due to threats to habitat and has been known to be native of Panama.

Key known facts 
However, there are still certain pieces of information available as they are similar to H.burgerianum in terms of size according to D'Arcy and Liesner.

It is a member of the Hedyosmum callooso-serratum group as the fused involucre represents.

Hedyosmum occurs in the West Indies, Central America and South America.

"(It is) a shrubby species which occurs in small subpopulations of up to 3,000 m in cloud forests."

Name origin 
While the name is clearly associated with Genus Hedyosmum it is obvious the Correanum was given in reference to a professor of University of Panama, Prof. Mireya D. Correa A.

References

Flora of Panama
correanum
Endangered plants
Taxonomy articles created by Polbot